Limo is a name of Kalenjin origin. People with that name include:

 Benjamin Limo (born 1974), Kenyan long-distance runner and 2005 World Champion over 5000 metres
 Felix Limo (born 1980), Kenyan long-distance runner and Chicago and London marathon winner
 Philemon Limo (born 1985), Kenyan long-distance runner competing in 10K races
 Remmy Limo (born 1971), Kenyan triple jumper
 Richard Limo (born 1980, Kenyan long-distance runner and 2001 World Champion over 5000 metres

Kalenjin names